Joanna Ampil is a musical theatre and film actress from the Philippines and United Kingdom.

Career 
Joanna is a stage actress. She played Kim in Miss Saigon (London, original Australian production, original United Kingdom and Ireland Tour and 10th Anniversary Performance), Mary Magdalene in the West End revival of Jesus Christ Superstar (London), Éponine in Les Misérables (London and Odyssey Arena Belfast Concert), Fantine in Les Misérables (London and Windsor Concert performed for HM Queen Elizabeth II and the Royal Family), Mimi in Rent (European Tour), Christmas Eve in Avenue Q (London), Sheila Franklin in Hair (London), Thanh in the world premiere of The Real Love (Los Angeles), Heidi in I Sing! (London), The ingénue June in the West End premiere of The Musical of Musicals: The Musical! (London), Francesca Johnson in the international premiere of The Bridges of Madison County (Manila), Inang Bayan in Rebel EDSA 30 (Manila), Maria in West Side Story (Manila), Maria Von Trapp in The Sound of Music (Manila), Nellie Forbush in South Pacific in Concert (Manila), Blue Fairy in Pinocchio: A New Musical (Singapore), West End Women (UK Tour), The Magic of Disney in Concert (Hyde Park, London), Defying Gravity: The Songs of Stephen Schwartz (Sydney), Grizabella in Cats (London, UK, European, Middle Eastern, Asian and 40th Anniversary Tours), Mary Magdalene in Jesus Christ Superstar in Concert (Tokyo) and Jenna in the international premiere of Waitress (Manila).

She performed on recordings of Miss Saigon (The Complete Symphonic Recording) as Kim, Jesus Christ Superstar (1996 London Revival Cast) as Mary Magdalene, The Postman and the Poet (Concept Cast) as Beatriz Gonzalez and Ang Larawan “The Portrait” (Original Soundtrack) as Candida.

Her debut musicals album "Joanna Ampil" was recorded in Abbey Road Studios in 2007 by JAY Records, followed with pop albums "Try Love" in 2010 by Sony Music and "Joanna Ampil" in 2014 with VIVA Records. Her latest singles are Reach for the Stars, Always Better and Memory.

She portrayed Candida in the feature film Ang Larawan “The Portrait” where she won the Metro Manila Film Festival MMFF 2017, PMPC Star Awards, Gawad Pasado, Luna, Gawad Tangi, Guillermo Award, Urduja Best Heritage Film Awards and the prestigious Gawad Urian Best Actress Awards.

She worked on the television series "Call Me Tita" (ABS CBN, iWant, TFC), "Babae Sa Septic Tank 3"(iWant, TFC), The Quest (BBC), Mummy Autopsy (Discovery Channel) and Broken News (BBC). She portrayed Corazon in Maalaala Mo Kaya's "Kadena" (ABS-CBN, iWant TFC)  wherein she won the GEMS Award for Best Actress for Television.

She performed Grizabella in the 40th Anniversary Tour of Cats (South Korea, 2020/2021) during the height of COVID-19 pandemic with socially distanced audiences and local government protocols; along with Phantom of the Opera World Tour (South Korea and Taiwan, 2020) at one point they were the only two performing productions in the whole world. This is chronicled in the new documentary "The Show Must Go On" directed and produced by Sammi Cannold. The documentary film will premiere at Broadway's Majestic Theatre on August 9, 2021, to benefit The Actor's Fund.

In the summer of 2021, Joanna made her Chichester Festival Theatre debut in Rodgers and Hammerstein's South Pacific as Bloody Mary. The production starred Julian Ovenden as Emile De Becque, Gina Beck as Ensign Nellie Forbush, Rob Houchen as Lieutenant Cable, Keir Charles as Billis and Sera Maehara as Liat. In the summer of 2022, she the role in London ahead of a UK Tour.

In 2023, she will star as The Engineer in a brand new production of Miss Saigon at Sheffield Theatres.

Theatre

Discography

Cast albums
Miss Saigon (The Complete Symphonic Recording)
Jesus Christ Superstar (1996 London Cast)
The Postman and The Poet (Concept Cast)
Ang Larawan (Original Soundtrack)

Studio albums
Joanna Ampil (2007; Jay Records)
Try Love (2010; Sony Music)
Joanna Ampil (2014; Viva Records)

Singles
Reach For The Stars
I'm Caught Between Goodbye and I Love You
For The Last Time I Felt Like This
Hanggang Saan
The Only Place To Be
Memory
Always Better
Kundimang Mahal (theme song of the movie Culion)
One More Gift

Filmography

Film
 One Day (2011) - Waitress
The Real Love (2011) - Thanh
 Ang Larawan (2017) - Candida Marasigan(Best Actress: Metro Manila Film Festival MMFF 2017, PMPC Star Awards, Gawad Pasado, Luna, Gawad Tangi, Guillermo Award, Urduja Best Heritage Film Awards and the prestigious Gawad Urian)
Babae Sa Septic Tank 3 (2019 Cinemalaya) - Herself/Narcisa
The Show Must Go On (2021 Documentary) - Herself
South Pacific (2021 Chichester Festival Theatre) - Bloody Mary

Television/Digital
 Call Me Tita (2019) - Maya
Maalaala Mo Kaya's "Kadena" (2019) - Corazon (Best Actress, GEMS Award for Best Actress for Television)
Babae Sa Septic Tank 3 (2019) - Herself/Narcisa
Bulawan CCP 50th Anniversary Gala (2019)
CNN Philippines presents Leading Women: Joanna Ampil
Broken News (2005) - Michelle Wong
ANC's Storyline: Joanna Ampil
TWBA: Tonight with Boy Abunda
ASAP
Eat Bulaga
The Ryzza Mae Show
The Tim Yap Show
Proudly Filipina
Magandang Buhay 
Art2Art 
Umagang Kay Ganda 
Vanhilt on Tour (Belgium) 
Van Gils and Gasten (Holland)
Slavi's Show (Bulgaria)
Nyhetsmorgon (Sweden)
Televizier Ring (Holland)
Dancing with the Stars (Poland)

Digital
Lyric and Beat (2022)

Concerts 

 Carols in the Domain (1995) The Domain, Sydney
 Stars of the Musicals (2001) Putra, Kuala Lumpur
 The Night of 100 Stars: Marvin Hamlisch (2001) London Palladium
 One Day More: A Symphonic Concert of Alain Boublil and Claude-Michel Schönberg (2004) Symphony Hall, Birmingham
 An Evening with Jason Robert Brown (2005) Players Theatre, London
 Musical Moments (2007) Hong Kong Cultural Centre
 Musical Moments (2008) Hong Kong Cultural Centre
 Musical Moments (2009) Hong Kong Cultural Centre
 Joanna Ampil, I Love... (2009) Music Museum, Manila
 West End Girl: Joanna Ampil (2010) OnStage, Manila
 Brad Little Unmasked with Joanna Ampil (2010) Taipei International Convention Centre, Taiwan
 Broadway Showstoppers (2011) Newport Performing Arts Theatre
 The Vietnam-Philippines Friendship Concert (2012) Hanoi Opera House, Vietnam
 The Night of 1000 Voices (2012) Royal Albert Hall, London
 The Magic of Disney in Concert (2012) Hyde Park, London In celebration of the H.M. The Queen's Diamond Jubilee
 West End Women: Kerry Ellis, Ria Jones & Joanna Ampil (2014) United Kingdom Tour
 Defying Gravity: The Songs of Stephen Schwartz (2016) Sydney
 A Woman's World: Joanna Ampil (2016) Shangri-La Plaza, Manila
 The Sound of Musicals: Joanna Ampil, Graham Bickley, Kerry Ellis and Oliver Tompsett (2016) United Kingdom Tour
 Una nit a Broadway Andrew Lloyd Webber: Joanna Ampil, John Owen Jones, Geronimo Rauch and Celinde Schoenmacher (2017) L'Auditori, Barcelona
 Love Wins: Joanna Ampil (2018) Maybank Theatre, Manila
 Silver Lining: Joanna Ampil (2019) Maybank Theatre, Manila
 Pinoy Playlist: Joanna Ampil (2019) Maybank Theatre, Manila

References

External links
 

Filipino musical theatre actresses
21st-century Filipino women singers
Living people
Musical theatre actresses
Musical theatre
People from Cagayan de Oro
People from Misamis Oriental
Year of birth missing (living people)
20th-century Filipino women singers